Ciliopagurus caparti is a species of hermit crab native to South East Atlantic.

References

Hermit crabs
Crustaceans of the Atlantic Ocean
Crustaceans described in 1952